San Agustín is a Peruvian football club, located in the city of Lima. The club was founded on August 9, 1970, with the name of club San Francisco, later was renamed Huracán San Isidro and finally received its final name after becoming sponsored by the Colegio San Agustin.

History
The club was 1986 Torneo Descentralizado champion, when defeated Alianza Lima in the finals.

The club have played at the highest level of Peruvian football on twelve occasions, from 1985 Torneo Descentralizado until 1996 Torneo Descentralizado when was relegated.

Honours

National
Peruvian Primera División:
Winners (1): 1986

Torneo Regional:
Winners (1): 1986

Peruvian Segunda División:
Winners (1): 1984

Regional
Liga Mayor de Fútbol de Lima:
Runner-up (1): 1981

Liga Provincial de Lima:
Winners (1): 1981

Liga Distrital de Lince:
Winners (6): 2011, 2012, 2013, 2014, 2015, 2016

Liga Distrital de San Isidro:
Winners (1): 1977

Performance in CONMEBOL competitions
Copa Libertadores: 1 appearance
1987: Group Stage

See also
List of football clubs in Peru
Peruvian football league system

External links
Peruvian football champions
Peruvian First Division 1986
Colegio San Agustin 1986

Football clubs in Peru
Association football clubs established in 1970